Sesuvium edmonstonei, commonly known as Galapagos carpet weed, is a species of plant in the family Aizoaceae. It is endemic to the Galápagos Islands (Ecuador).

Description

Sesuvium edmonstonei is a low-growing perennial plant. The stems, which are fleshy and covered with scales, are sometimes woody at the base. The flowers grow in the leaf axils, each having a five-lobed white calyx, no petals, and many stamens. The fruits that follow are ovoid capsules, with lids, containing black seeds with wrinkled cuticles. The plants develop orange and red hues in the cool season.

Distribution and habitat
This succulent plant is endemic to the Galapagos Islands. It is found on Darwin Island, Española Island, Fernandina Island, Floreana Island, Genovesa Island, Isabela Island, Rábida Island, San Cristóbal Island, Santa Cruz Island, Santiago Island and Wolf Island. It spreads in sheets across both rocky and sandy ground.

References

External links

Endemic flora of Galápagos
edmonstonei
Least concern plants
Taxonomy articles created by Polbot
Taxobox binomials not recognized by IUCN